Qianotrechus is a genus of beetles in the family Carabidae, containing the following five species:

 Qianotrechus congcongae Tian & Zhao, 2021
 Qianotrechus grebennikovi Deuve, 2014
 Qianotrechus laevis Uéno, 2000
 Qianotrechus magnicollis Uéno, 2000
 Qianotrechus tenuicollis Uéno, 2000

References

Trechinae